The HZ University of Applied Sciences (Short: HZ) is a Dutch university of applied sciences with campuses in Zeeland. 

HZ University of Applied Sciences has three locaties:

 Edisonweg in Vlissingen
 HZ Toren in Vlissingen
 Groene Woud in Middelburg

References

External links 
 

Vocational universities in the Netherlands
Education in Zeeland
Buildings and structures in Vlissingen